Khuloud Khalil Daibes, also transliterated as Khouloud D'eibes, is a Palestinian architect and former politician and diplomat. She was born on 16 April 1965 in Jerusalem

Career 

Khuloud Daibes holds a PhD in Architecture from University of Hannover in Germany. She was the Director of the Center for Preserving Cultural Heritage in Bethlehem. She was also a lecturer in the Tourism Masters Program at Bethlehem University. For 15 years, she was involved with many Palestinian and international organizations dealing with cultural heritage and tourism in the Palestinian Territories.

Positions and rules
She served as the Tourism Minister in the Palestinian National Unity Government of March 2007 and successive Palestinian Authority emergency governments until 2012, and from 2007 to 2009 also as Minister of Women's Affairs.

In July 2013, Daibes became the representative of the Palestinian mission in Germany.

References

1965 births
Ambassadors of the State of Palestine to Germany
Living people
Government ministers of the Palestinian National Authority
Palestinian architects
Women government ministers of the Palestinian National Authority
University of Hanover alumni
Academic staff of Bethlehem University
Palestinian women diplomats
People from Zababdeh
Palestinian women ambassadors
Palestinian expatriates in Germany